Ginepro Cocchi (13 October 1908 – 6 March 1939), born Antonio Cocchi, was an Italian Roman Catholic priest who became a member of the Order of Friars Minor order. He took the name of "Ginepro" after admittance into the Franciscan order. He served in the missions in China until 1939 when he was killed while evangelizing in Chinese villages. He is buried in China.

He is a candidate for canonization with the title Servant of God. All the processes have been completed as of 2010 and all is required is the approval of the pope in order for the beatification to take place.

Life
Antonio Cocchi was born in Artena on 13 October 1908 to Attilio Cocchi and Italia Cioccali.

He commenced his studies for the priesthood in 1918 and was noted for his innocence and his mode of life. These mirrored the observations of the rector Elia Carosi who was struck with the humble and diligent seminarian. He entered the novitiate of the Order of Friars Minor in Rieti on 10 September 1923 and he later assumed the habit with the name of "Ginepro". He made his simple vows on 15 October 1924. Among his classmates while undergoing theological studies in Rome was Giuseppe Beschin – future Servant of God – and Gabriele Allegra – future Blessed. He took his solemn profession on 8 December 1929 and on 19 July 1931 was ordained to the priesthood in the church of Sant'Ignazio. He celebrated his first Mass on 2 August.

Cocchi and 33 other missionaries had a private audience with Pope Pius XI in 1931 and on 30 September the 34 men embarked for China to work in the missions. Two months after his arrival he and fifteen other Franciscans met the Apostolic Vicar Agapito Fiorentini. He continued his theological studies and was sent to Kuo-hsien; he reached Ting-Shaing at the beginning of 1933 where he mastered the Chinese language. Seven months later he was entrusted several villages to work in.

On 6 March 1939 he arrived in the village of Shangliandi. One day 30 communist soldiers burst into his room. He was beaten and dragged out of the village where he was shot dead.

Beatification process
The beatification process did not commence in China but did all of its work in Velletri-Segni after the cause was introduced under Pope John Paul II on 17 December 1994 which granted him the posthumous title Servant of God. The process saw the accumulation of documentation and witness testimonies spanning from 12 March 1995 until 3 March 1996; the process was ratified on 29 March 1996 in order for the cause to proceed to the next stage.

The Positio – all documentation gathered – was sent to the Congregation for the Causes of Saints for further evaluation in 1999 and was given to the historical archive for their inspection on 9 March 1999. From there it proceeded to the advising theologians on 9 September 2008 and then to the members of the congregation itself in 2010. Papal approval is the next step for the beatification to take place.

References

External links
Hagiography Circle

1908 births
1939 deaths
20th-century venerated Christians
20th-century Roman Catholic martyrs
Italian Roman Catholic missionaries
Clergy from Rome
Capuchins
Italian Servants of God
Roman Catholic missionaries in China
Italian people murdered abroad
People murdered in China
Italian emigrants to China
20th-century Italian Roman Catholic priests
Deaths by firearm in China